The following is a list of educational institutions in Etobicoke, a district of Toronto, Ontario, Canada. Etobicoke is a former municipality within Toronto and served as a suburb of Toronto within Metropolitan Toronto.

Four school boards provide public elementary and secondary education to resident pupils of Etobicoke. The four school boards operate as either English or French first language school boards, and as either secular or separate school boards. In addition to elementary and secondary schools, Etobicoke is also home to two public post-secondary institutions.

Post-secondary
Etobicoke is home to two public post-secondary institutions, Humber College, and the University of Guelph-Humber. Humber College is a public college that operates two campuses in Etobicoke, the Humber North campus, and the Lakeshore campus. University of Guelph-Humber is a post-secondary institutions jointly operated by Humber College, and the University of Guelph. The University of Guelph-Humber does not hold degree granting powers, with Guelph-Humber graduates receiving a degree formally from the University of Guelph.

Secondary
Secondary schools in Etobicoke typically offer schooling for students from Grades 9 to 12. Two public school boards operate secondary schools in Etobicoke, the Toronto Catholic District School Board (TCDSB), and the Toronto District School Board (TDSB). Both school boards are English first language school boards, although TCDSB is a separate school board, whereas TDSB is a secular school board. Toronto's two French first language public school boards, the separate Conseil scolaire catholique MonAvenir, and the secular Conseil scolaire Viamonde (CSV), do not operate a secondary school within Etobicoke. CSV and MonAvenir secondary students attend secondary schools located in the neighbouring districts of North York, or Old Toronto.

In addition to standard secondary schools, the secular English first language school board, the Toronto District School Board (TDSB), also operates adult schools in Etobicoke, such as the Burnhamthorpe Adult Learning Centre at Burnhamthorpe Collegiate Institute.

The following is a list of public secondary schools in Etobicoke,

Defunct or holding schools

Elementary
All four Toronto-based public school boards operate institutions in Etobicoke that provide elementary education.

TDSB elementary institutions are categorized as junior schools, middle schools, and junior middle schools. Junior schools typically provide schooling for students from Junior Kindergarten to Grades 5 or 6; whereas middle schools typically provide schooling for students from Grades 6/7 to 8. Junior middle schools are institutions that provides full elementary education from Junior Kindergarten to Grade 8. Elementary institutions in Etobicoke that are operated by TCDSB are named Catholic schools. Elementary schools operated by CSV are named école élémentaire, whereas schools operated by MonAvenir are known as école élémentaire catholique.

The following is a list of public elementary schools in Etobicoke.

Notes

See also
 Education in Toronto
 List of educational institutions in Scarborough
 List of schools of the Conseil scolaire Viamonde
 List of schools of the Conseil scolaire catholique MonAvenir
 List of schools in the Toronto Catholic District School Board
 List of schools in the Toronto District School Board

 
Etobicoke